The 1941 Dunedin mayoral election was part of the New Zealand local elections held that same year. In 1941, elections were held for the Mayor of Dunedin plus other local government positions including twelve city councillors. The polling was conducted using the standard first-past-the-post electoral method.

Andrew Allen, the incumbent Mayor, sought re-election for a second term. He was successful, defeating a strong challenge by Gervan McMillan the Labour MP for Dunedin West.

Mayoral results

Council results

References

Mayoral elections in Dunedin
 Dunedin mayoral election
Politics of Dunedin
1940s in Dunedin